Fadisheh (also Romanized as Fadīsheh) is a village in Ghazali Rural District, Miyan Jolgeh District, Nishapur County, Razavi Khorasan Province, Iran. At the 2006 census, its population was 1,372, in 368 families.

References 

Populated places in Nishapur County